Brookville is a city in Saline County, Kansas, United States.  As of the 2020 census, the population of the city was 247.

History
Brookville was laid out in 1870 when the Kansas Pacific Railway was extended to that point. The first post office in Brookville was established in February 1870.

Geography
Brookville is located at  (38.773464, -97.868015).

Climate
The climate in this area is characterized by hot, humid summers and generally mild to cool winters.  According to the Köppen Climate Classification system, Brookville has a humid subtropical climate, abbreviated "Cfa" on climate maps.

Demographics

It is part of the Salina Micropolitan Statistical Area.

2010 census
, there were 262 people, 101 households, and 72 families residing in the city. The racial makeup of the city was 94.3% White, 0.4% Native American, 0.4% Pacific Islander, 1.5% from other races, and 3.4% from two or more races. Hispanic or Latino of any race were 5.0% of the population.

There were 101 households, of which 38.6% had children under the age of 18 living with them, 54.5% were married couples living together, 8.9% had a female householder with no husband present, 7.9% had a male householder with no wife present, and 28.7% were non-families. 23.8% of all households were made up of individuals, and 7% had someone living alone who was 65 years of age or older. The average household size was 2.59 and the average family size was 2.97.

The median age in the city was 39 years. 27.9% of residents were under the age of 18; 7.5% were between the ages of 18 and 24; 25.2% were from 25 to 44; 28.7% were from 45 to 64; and 10.7% were 65 years of age or older. The gender makeup of the city was 54.6% male and 45.4% female.

2000 census

, there were 259 people, 104 households, and 74 families residing in the city. The racial makeup of the city was 98.46% White, 0.39% Native American, and 1.16% from two or more races. Hispanic or Latino of any race were 6.18% of the population.

There were 104 households, out of which 30.8% had children under the age of 18 living with them, 64.4% were married couples living together, 4.8% had a female householder with no husband present, and 27.9% were non-families. 26.0% of all households were made up of individuals, and 12.5% had someone living alone who was 65 years of age or older. The average household size was 2.49 and the average family size was 2.97.

In the city, the population was spread out, with 23.9% under the age of 18, 8.5% from 18 to 24, 30.5% from 25 to 44, 24.3% from 45 to 64, and 12.7% who were 65 years of age or older. The median age was 39 years. For every 100 females, there were 115.8 males. For every 100 females age 18 and over, there were 109.6 males.

The median income for a household in the city was $32,250, and the median income for a family was $45,417. Males had a median income of $30,625 versus $24,000 for females. The per capita income for the city was $18,945. About 9.1% of families and 18.4% of the population were below the poverty line, including 27.8% of those under the age of eighteen and 15.6% of those 65 or over.

Education
The community is served by Ell-Saline USD 307 public school district.  Ell-Saline schools are located in Brookville.  The Ell-Saline school mascot is Cardinals.

Prior to school unification as Ell-Saline High School, the Brookville High School mascot was Brookville Cardinals. The Brookville Cardinals won the Kansas State High School boys class BB basketball championship in 1952.

In popular culture
One scene of the 1980 film Up the Academy was filmed in Brookville, where the boys drive off without paying for fuel.

See also
 National Register of Historic Places listings in Saline County, Kansas

References

Further reading

External links

 Brookville - Directory of Public Officials
 Brookville Hotel removed from Historic Register
 Brookville city map, KDOT

Cities in Kansas
Cities in Saline County, Kansas
Salina, Kansas micropolitan area
1870 establishments in Kansas
Populated places established in 1870